Black Brazilian is a term used to categorise by race or color Brazilian citizens who are black. 7.61% of the population of Brazil consider themselves black (preto).

List of black Brazilians by occupation

Business 
 Francisco Paulo de Almeida, Baron of Guaraciaba

Football 

 Adalberto Machado
 Adailton
 Adriano
 Allano
 Alessandro Santos - naturalised Japanese footballer
 André Luís Leite
 André Bahia
 Andrezinho
 Andrey Santos
 Antônio Géder
 Ari - Naturalised Russian footballer
 Arouca
 Ary Borges
 Betao
 Bill
 Boison Wynney
 Brandão
 Brenner Alves Sabino
 Bruno Cantanhede
 Bruno Cortez
 Bruno Peres
 Bruno
 Bruno Viana
 Chay
 Cacapa
 Cacau naturalised German footballer
 Carlinhos
 Cafu
 Carlāo
 Carlos Alberto
 César Sampaio
 Cicinho
 Claudinho
 Cléber
 Dalbert Henrique
 Daniel Carvalho
 Daniel dos Anjos
 Danilo dos santos
 Danilo Barbosa
 Danilo
 Danilo Pereira
 Dankler
 David
 Denilson
 Diego Costa
 Diego Tardelli
 Douglas
 Douglas Tanque
 Douglas Teixeira
 Dyego Sousa
 Edcarlos
 Éder Militão
 Eduardo  – naturalised Croatian footballer
 Elber
 Emerson
 Emerson Sheik - naturalised Qatari footballer
 Enio
 Erick
 Eric Ramires
 Ewerthon
 Evander
 Evanilson
 Everaldo
 Everton Kempes
 Fábio Simplício
 Felipe Melo
 Felipe Santana
 Flávio Conceição
 Gabriel
 Gerson
 Geovanni
 Gil
 Gökçek Vederson
 Gladstone
 Gleison Bremer
 Guly Do Prado
 Guilherme guedes
 Helton Da Silva
 Hilton Moreira
 Humberlito Borges
 Isael
 Jacksen F. Tiago
 Jajá
 Jailson
Jairzinho
 Jemerson
 Jô
 Jorge
 Joelinton
 Junior Baiano
 Junior Messias
 Júnior
 Kayky
 Liédson
 Lincoln
 Lucas
 Lulinha
Mauro Júnior
 Márcio Amoroso
 Marcos Assunçao
 Maicosuel
 Mayke
 Mazinho
 Mehmet Aurelio - naturalised Turkish footballer
 Michel
 Michel Bastos
Neymar
 Paulo Assunção
 Patrick de Paula
Pelé
 Jeffinho
Júlio Baptista
Juan
 Luís Fabiano
 Luciano
 Luciano Oliveira
Ronaldinho
Alex Teixeira
Sidnei
Fred
Richarlison 
Robinho
 Romarinho
Douglas Costa
Antony
Grafite
Fernandinho
Zé Roberto
Vágner Love
Luiz Adriano
 Luiz Gustavo
 Kanu
Gilberto Silva
 Fernando
Rodrigo
 Rodrygo
Mineiro
 Murilo Costa
Dida
Alex Rodrigo Dias da Costa
Kléber
Gilberto
Leonidas da Silva
Formiga
 Gabriel Magalhães
 Marquinhos
 Marquinhos Cipriano
Paulinho
Sammirnaturalised Croatian footballer
Roberto Carlos
Ramires
Willian
Vinícius Júnior
 Vinicius Tobias
David Neres
Gabriel Jesus
Marcelo
Moisés
Anderson
 Anderson Salles
 Sidnei
Lucas Ribeiro
Marcos de Paula
 Marcos Leonardo
 Matheus Salustiano
Robson Bambu
Júlio César
 Jussiê
 Jucilei
Malcom
 Matheus Davó
 Matheus Fernandes
 Naldo
 Obina
 Taison
 Thiago
 Paulão
 Pedrinho
 Rafael
 Rafael Silva
 Renan Lodi
 Reinier Jesus
 Ricardo Oliveira
 Samuel Lino
 Somalia
 Taylon Correa
 Thiago Mendes
 Washington Alves
 Wesley Moraes
 Wesley Ribeiro
 Willians
 Zizinho
 Helinho
 Júnior Brumado
 Matheus Babi
 Matheus Nunes
 Nikão
 Tchê Tchê
Endrick Felipe
 Rodrigo Becão
 Rwan Seco
 Sidao
 Léo Lelis
 Luis Phelipe
 Luís Oliveira
 Mariano
 Marcos Wendel
 Vinícius
 Talles Costa
 Lucas Sena
 Alex Oliveira
 Jordi Martins
 Junior Dos Santos
 Kelvin
 Kim
 Marcelinho
 Marinho
 Muralha
 Renyer
 Rodrigo Freitas
 Rodrigo Morenonaturalised Spanish footballer
 Vanderlan
 Vitor Roque
 Vlademir
 Arthur
 Guilherme
 Juan Jesus
 Márcio Senna
 Marcos Senna - naturalised Spanish footballer
 Marcos Vinicius
 Raul Gustavo
 Rick
 Richard
 Savio
 Tinga
 William Matheus
 João Pedro
 Joao Victor
 Kaio Jorge
 Miguel Silveira
 Ronan Falcão
 Roque Junior
 Talisca
 Wendell
 Weslen Júnior
 Gabriel Veron
 Gustavo Assunção
 Matheuzinho
 Ângelo Gabriel
 Jonata
 Tetê
 Breno Lopes
 Rodrigo Muniz
 Giva
 Márcio Nobre
 Samuel Xavier
 LINO
 Gabriel Silva
 Lorran

Capoeira 

 Amen Santo
 Mestre Bimba
 Manuel dos Reis Machado
 Cobra Mansa
 João Grande
 João Pereira dos Santos
 Pedro Moraes Trindade
 Vicente Ferreira Pastinha
 Pé de Chumbo

Other sports 

Adhemar Ferreira da Silvaathlete, won two olympic gold medals on the triple jump
Daiane dos Santosgymnast
Anderson Silvamixed martial arts fighter, former UFC middleweight champion
Leandro Barbosabasketball player
Nenêbasketball player
Maguilaboxer
Janeth Arcainbasketball player
Jadel Gregórioathlete
Nelson Prudêncioathlete
Zuluzinhowrestler
Diogo SilvaTaekwondo gold medal in 2007 Panamerican Games
Robson Caetanoathlete
Rafaela Silva judoka
Joice Silvafreestyle wrestler 
Rosângela Santostrack and field sprint athlete 
Fabiana Claudino volleyball player
Fernanda Garay volleyball player
Cristiano Felício basketball player
 Héritier Lumumba

Actors 
Abdias do Nascimento
Alexandre Rodrigues
Camila Pitanga
Darlan Cunha
Dhu Moraes
Douglas Silva
Eliezer Gomes
Grande Otelo
Lázaro Ramos
Leandro Firmino
Milton Gonçalves
Preta Gil
Ruth de Souza
Zeze Motta
Seu Jorge
Taís Araújo
Isabel Fillardis
Yaya DaCosta

Fashion 

Emanuela de Paula
Lais Ribeiro
 Monalysa Alcântara

Music 

Alcione
Alexandre Pires
Martinho da Vila
Tim Maia
Milton Nascimento
Jorge Aragão
Alex Pereira Barbosa
Jorge Ben-Jor
Emilio Santiago
Leci Brandão
Carlinhos Brown
Cartola
Chico César
Taio Cruz
Clara Nunes
Mauro Diniz
Djavan
Gilberto Gil
Almir Guineto
Karol Conká
Paula Lima
Ludmilla
Nei Lopes
Tim Maia
Racionais MC's
Vanessa da Mata
Luciana Mello
Margareth Menezes
Wilson Moreira
Jair Oliveira
Marcelo Maldonado Gomes Peixoto
Pixinguinha
Jared Gomes
Jorge Mário da Silva
Marco Antonio Silva
Elza Soares
Wagner Borges Ribeiro de Souza
Sandra de Sá

Politics 

Alceu Collares - Rio Grande do Sul State Governor (1991–1994)
Abdias do Nascimento - Federal Deputy and Nobel Prize for Peace nominee
Benedita da Silva - first female senator in Brazil, Rio de Janeiro State Governor (2002), Minister of Social Action
Celso Pitta - São Paulo City Mayor (1997–2000)
João Alves Filho - Sergipe State Governor (1983–1987; 1991–1994)
Francisco de Sales Torres Homem, Viscount of Inhomirim - Minister of Finance (1858-1859, 1870-1871)
 Francisco José do Nascimento (1839–1914) - Abolitionist
Paulo Paim - Federal Deputy and Senator
Otavio Mangabeira - Governor of Bahia, and Minister of Foreign Affairs (1926–1930)
Carlos Marighella - Politician, writer and guerrilla fighter
Romário - Federal Senator from Rio de Janeiro

Supreme Court Justices 

Joaquim Benedito Barbosa Gomes (since 2003)

Military 

Henrique Dias - military leader during the Dutch–Portuguese War, was knighted for his services during the two Battles of Guararapes.

Writers 

Machado de Assis
Lima Barreto
João da Cruz e Sousa
Joel Rufino dos Santos
Luís Gama
Tânia Martins
José do Patrocínio
Lourdes Teodoro

Science and Technology 

Sonia Guimarães - professor and first black Brazilian woman to receive a doctorate in physics
André Rebouças - engineer
Milton Santos - geographer, received the Vautrin Lud International Geography Prize in 1994

Religion 

Dom José Maria "Dom Pelé" Pires - Emerit Archbishop of Paraíba
Helvécio Martins - first Black to be called as a general authority of the Church of Jesus Christ of Latter-day Saints
Valdemiro Santiago - evangelical pastor and founder and leader of the Igreja Mundial do Poder de Deus
Father António Vieira

Photo-gallery of famous Black Brazilians

See also
List of topics related to the Black Diaspora
List of Afro-Latinos
Race in Brazil
Demographics of Brazil
Pardo
Slavery in Brazil

Other groups

African American
Afro-Arab
Afro-Belizean
Afro-Cuban
Afro-Ecuadorian
Australians of African descent
Afro-Germans
Afro-Irish
Afro-Latino
Afro-Mexican
Afro-Peruvian
Afro-Puerto Rican
Afro-Trinidadian and Tobagonian
Black British
Afro-Caribbean American
Black Canadians
Afro-European
Beta Israel

References

External links
Portal Afro  
Afro Brazilian Museum 

Brazil
Brazilians
Black African descent
African
African
de:Afrobrasilianer
nl:Afro-Brazilianen